Ernst Grube Stadium was a multi-use stadium in Magdeburg, Germany.  It was mostly used for football matches.  The stadium had a capacity of 25,800 people and was built in 1955. The ground was demolished in 2005 to make room for a new stadium that has been opened in December 2006. In 5 November 1933 Germany played a friendly match against Norway (2:2) here which name of stadium was Stadion am Gübser Damm.

History
After World War II the city of Magdeburg planned to erect a sports center consisting among others of a stadium with a capacity for 80,000 people and a natatorium. However, the city was unable to acquire the site originally intended and so the project was abandoned. Instead, the city decided to build a new stadium east of the Elbe river, at the site of the SV Victoria 96 Magdeburg stadium. The stadium was equipped with an athletics track and was opened in front of a crowd of 40,000 on September 18, 1955. Over the years, it was upgraded several times, parts of the stands were put under a roof, and floodlights were installed. However, after the reunification of Germany the stadium gradually fell into disrepair and in 2004 the city council decided to build a new one at the same site. The Ernst-Grube-Stadion was demolished between March and June 2005, and construction of the new stadium began on July 4, 2005.
It hosted the home matches of 1. FC Magdeburg until 2004. The last competitive match was played there on December 4, 2004 against FSV Zwickau.

References

Sports venues demolished in 2005
Football venues in East Germany
Defunct football venues in Germany
1. FC Magdeburg
Buildings and structures in Magdeburg
Defunct sports venues in Germany
Sports venues in Saxony-Anhalt
Sports venues completed in 1955
2005 disestablishments in Germany
1955 establishments in East Germany
Tourist attractions in Magdeburg